The Hayashi Department Store is a department store in West Central District, Tainan, Taiwan.

History
It was originally completed and opened on 5 December 1932, during Japanese rule. Upon completion, the building was one of two such stores in Taiwan with state-of-the-art features of elevators. The building was bombed by the United States airplanes at the end of World War II. After refurbishment, the building began to be restored in 2006. It was finally reopened on 14 June 2014 in a ceremony presided by Tainan Mayor William Lai.

Architecture
The department store is a five-story building. It features exhibitions on local farming culture and handicraft on the top floor. There is also Western-style cafeterias and an observation deck.

Transportation
The department store is accessible within walking distance south west of Tainan Station of Taiwan Railways.

See also
 List of tourist attractions in Taiwan

References

External links

 

1932 establishments in Taiwan
Buildings and structures in Tainan
Tourist attractions in Tainan
Department stores of Taiwan
Commercial buildings completed in 1932